ENMTP (from Entreprise Nationale des Materiels de Travaux Publics ) is an Algerian company specializing in the development, manufacture and distribution of machinery used in public works. It has registered capital of 15.6 billion DA and is 100% owned by the state.

Following the restructuring of the Sonacome and SN METAL, the National Company of heavy equipment "ENMTP" was transformed into joint stock company in 1995.

The ENMTP Group produced materials under licenses acquired from recognized manufacturers, such as:

Liebherr (Germany) for excavators, cranes, bulldozers and large shippers
O & K (Germany) for loaders
INGERSOLL RAND CO (United States) in the field of compressors and compactors
POTAIN (United States) for the production of building cranes
Braud & Faucheux for manufacturing concrete mixers
and materials developed with the company's internal skills: backhoe loaders, Graders, BTS Press and various small products

The industrial potential of ENMTP Group is considered one of the largest in Africa. It is structured according to specialization by product lines. Each unit have the largest industrial autonomy.

Infrastructures 
4 Manufacturing plants and a commercial network covering Algeria 
ENMTP manages a sizeable industrial potential involving 2,400 workers who generated a turnover of US$60 million in 2006, and expects US$70 million by the year 2007 with a 2,350-strong workforce.

This potential is mainly organized  in the main engineering industries and related products:

 Public works equipments (Excavators, Hydraulic Cranes, Loaders, Bulldozers…) 
 Compactors and compressors 
 Concrete equipments.
 
The ENMTP restructuring strategy grants a leading part to partnership with national or international operators, irrespective of their legal status.
Whatever the option, what matters most is that it achieves the desired targets:

-Developing competitive products 
-Expanding distribution channels, notably abroad 
-Securing technological "know how".

Partnership
Promoting partnership through the setting up of subsidiaries in order to : 
-Upgrade products and manufacturing process 
-Develop competitive product 
-Rehabilitate and update the tool of production 
-Promote access to foreign markets
This partnership policy lead to the creation of two new Companies,
in 2012 Somatel Liebherr was created with the German  group  Liebherr.
in 2013 Europactor Algeria was created with the Spanish company Europactor Aaecomhel.

Products
The current line of products manufactured by the company includes:
 Hydraulic Excavators
 Wheel loaders
 Bulldozers
 Backhoe loaders
 Graders
 Propelled cranes
 Tower crane
 Compaction Equipment
 Stationary Compressors (Electric/Diesel)
 Concrete mixers
 Dumpers
 Concrete pumps
 Spreaders
and other small & medium constructions machines.

See also
Sonacome
Cirta

References

Construction equipment manufacturers of Algeria
Crane manufacturers
Manufacturing companies established in 1983
Companies based in Constantine, Algeria
Government-owned companies of Algeria
Algerian brands
 
1983 establishments in Algeria